Who's Who is a reference work. It has been published annually as a book since 1849. It is also published online and has been published on CD-ROM. It gives information on influential people from around the world. It lists people who influence British life. Entries include notable figures from government, politics, academia, business, sport and the arts. Who's Who 2022 is the 174th edition and includes more than 33,000 people.

In 2004, the book was described as the United Kingdom's most prominent work of biographical reference.

The book is the original Who's Who book and "the pioneer work of its type". The book is an origin of the expression "who's who" used in a wider sense.

History
Who's Who has been published since 1849. It was originally published by Baily Brothers. Since 1897, it has been published by A & C Black. It has been published in New York by the Macmillan Company and by St. Martin's Press.

From 1849 to 1850, Who's Who was edited by Henry Robert Addison, from 1851 to 1864 by Charles Henry Oakes, from 1865 by William John Lawson and from 1897 to 1899 by Douglas Brooke Wheelton Sladen. Subsequent editions do not disclose the identity of their editor.

Originally, it merely provided lists of the names of notable people, for example all members of parliament and all bishops. Beginning with the 1897 edition, it listed people alphabetically and provided fuller biographical details.

Cedric A Larson said that Who's Who in 1849 was not biographical. Who's Who turned into a biographical dictionary in 1897. In 1963 and 1975, William L Rivers wrote that Who's Who includes biographical information.

In 1973, a spinoff version, called The Academic Who's Who, was released by the same publisher. Both the first edition, published in 1973, and the second edition, published in 1975, were published by Adam & Charles Black in London. The first US edition was published by Bowker in New York, and the second by Gale Research in Detroit. The second edition contained biographies of almost seven thousand academics.

Who's Who 1897–1996 was published on CD-ROM and was awarded the McColvin Medal. Who's Who 1897–1998 was also published on CD-ROM. Who's Who was included in KnowUK from 1999. Who's Who 2005 was included in Xreferplus. The Who's Who & Who Was Who website (ukwhoswho.com) is dated from 2007 onwards. Who's Who continues to be published annually in hard copy.

A history of Who's Who was published to coincide with the 150th edition in 1998. "Preface with a Brief History 1849–1998" was included in Who's Who 1998.

Biographies
Academics who study elites have used the book as the primary reference for determining who is part of the British elite, and journalists agree that the book is a prime guide to the country's establishment.

Inclusiveness
The subjects of Who's Who entries include peers, MPs, judges, senior civil servants, writers, actors, lawyers, scientists, researchers, athletes and artists. 50 percent of new entrants (such as those holding a professorial chair at Oxbridge, hereditary members of the aristocracy, MPs, judges, etc.) are included automatically by virtue of their office; the other 50 percent are chosen at the discretion of a board of advisors. Inclusion has come to carry a considerable level of prestige: Paul Levy stated in The Wall Street Journal in 1996 that having an entry in Who's Who "really puts the stamp of eminence on a modern British life".

Once someone is included in Who's Who they remain in it for life: MPs, for example, are not removed when they leave Parliament. The 7th Earl of Lucan continued to be listed in the book after he went missing in 1974 and after he was declared legally dead in 1999. He was listed in Who's Who 2016, which was published in 2015. As of 2022, the most recent version of his entry on the Who's Who & Who Was Who website is dated 1 December 2016.

Inclusion in Who's Who does not involve any payment by or to the subject, or even any obligation to buy a copy. Some individuals have attempted to offer bribes to the publishers in attempts to be included. To shield themselves from unwanted pressures, the editorial staff and selection panel operate in anonymity.

The publication includes the members of the Scottish Parliament, Welsh and Northern Ireland Assemblies, members of the House of Commons, the chief executives of all UK cities and counties, and foreign ambassadors accredited to London. There is a high proportion of Oxford and Cambridge graduates among the new entrants in Who's Who 2008. During the reign of Queen Victoria, the proportion of such graduates was less than 20%.

In a review of Who's Who, 1907, the Law Magazine and Review wrote "So comprehensive is the scheme of the work that it is well-nigh impossible to find any person at all entitled to be considered prominent in any particular sphere, whose biography is not included". The Expository Times wrote that Who's Who, 1910 included "Everybody who is anybody". The Journal of the Royal Institute of British Architects wrote that the choice of subjects included in Who's Who 1936 was generally appropriate. Writing in The Spectator about a radio documentary on the book they did for BBC Radio 4 in 2004, Crick and Rosenbaum criticised, or reported that others had criticised, the publication for its lack of inclusion of well known celebrities, sports personalities, solicitors, and the quasi-totality of Britain's wealthiest people. They also questioned the inclusion of baronets. In 2007, Jeremy Paxman criticised the publication for failing to include more non-British MEPs. In 2010, Charles Moore criticised the criticism of the inclusiveness of Who's Who. In 2021, it was reported that Michael Grade, who was Chairman of the Board of Governors of the BBC from 2004 to 2006, had criticised Who's Who for failing to include entries for Benedict Cumberbatch and Eddie Redmayne. (Both Cumberbatch and Redmayne have appeared in BBC television programmes).

Richard Fitzwilliams, former editor of The International Who’s Who quoted in The Independent in 2015 indicated that Arthur Scargill and Tony Benn were included in Who's Who against their wishes, and that W. S. Gilbert was "threatened with being given a concocted version of his entry unless he provided one". Waller said that the story about Gilbert is not entirely accurate. Scargill had previously argued in 2004 that people who do not wish to be in Who's Who should be allowed to opt out.

Compilation and authorship
From 1897 onwards, entries have been compiled from questionnaires filled in by their subjects and then returned to the publisher. Lea and Day wrote that this approach normally leads to increased accuracy.

It has been said that, from Who's Who 1897 onwards, the entries, or the majority of them, are autobiographical. Nature Notes described the notices of naturalists in Who's Who, 1900 as "virtually autobiographical".

In A & C Black Ltd v Claude Stacey Ltd, Mr Justice Tomlin (as he then was), sitting in the Chancery Division of the High Court of Justice in England, held that the "author", within the meaning of that expression in section 5 of the Copyright Act 1911, of each biography in Who's Who was the compiler. This decision has been cited as authority as to the meaning of the expression "author" in the Copyright, Designs and Patents Act 1988.

In 2004, Crick and Rosenbaum wrote that there were questions about the compilation process of the entries. They also wrote that they extensively used Who's Who themselves, and that any questions about the compilation process of the entries were not sufficient to actually stop them extensively using Who's Who themselves.

Content
Entries typically include full names, dates of birth, career details, club memberships, education, professional qualifications, publications, recreations and contact details.

Utility
Who's Who has been repeatedly described as useful and indispensable.

Reliability and accuracy
The Saturday Review wrote that Who's Who 1904 is "generally accurate". The World's Paper Trade Review wrote that "it may be relied on not only as being accurate but really authoritative". The Law Magazine and Review wrote that "The accuracy of the information given shows the great care with which this work has been compiled".

The Accountant's Magazine spoke of "the remarkable accuracy" of Who's Who, 1905. The Canada Lancet wrote that "The book contains a vast amount of reliable information regarding persons of note throughout the British Empire". The Law Journal wrote that the "biographical details of judges and leading lawyers . . . so far as we have tested them, are accurate".

Engineering wrote that Who's Who, 1906 gave "accurate information regarding the career of men whose names are frequently before the public in an official or other capacity". Notes and Queries wrote that "For those engaged in literary and journalistic pursuits, Who's Who remains the most trustworthy . . . work of personal reference". The Library World wrote that "its accuracy is well maintained".

The Congregationalist and Christian World wrote that Who's Who, 1907 "comes promptly to aid journalists and others who wish to consult . . . accurate biographies of the leading personages in the Western political and literary world, Britons of course predominating." The Standard called it "a monument of painstaking care". Page's Weekly wrote that "we have subjected Who's Who to several tests and are glad to find that the accuracy which pervades the subject matter is again worthy of high commendation". Medical Record wrote that "The data about Americans mentioned in the work appear to be in the main correct, though we notice that the name of the late Albert Bierstadt, the artist, is retained in the book as though he were still living." The United Service Magazine wrote that "Immense pains are taken to ensure accuracy".

The Dublin Journal of Medical Science wrote that the biographies in Who's Who, 1908 "may be considered to be accurate". The Electrical Review wrote that "the details may generally be regarded as accurate". Page's Weekly added that "We have many occasions had reason to admire the accuracy which is attained by the Editor of Who's Who".

Country Life wrote that Who's Who, 1909 was "of most praiseworthy accuracy". The Scots Law Times wrote that "The information given about the persons named may be taken as reliable". The Empire Review and Magazine wrote "the great pains taken to ensure accuracy gives to the volume additional value". The American Review of Reviews wrote that it "continues . . . to sustain its high level of accuracy".

Knowledge & Scientific News wrote that Who's Who, 1910 "is kept up-to-date and accurate". The Railway News wrote that "The information is brought thoroughly up to date". Country Life wrote that "This year it appears to be as accurate . . . as usual." Page's Weekly wrote that "Who's Who has a notable reputation to maintain and it is not surprising to find, therefore, that exceptional care is taken to render it a reference work of unimpeachable accuracy."

The accuracy of Who's Who 1935 was praised by Public Opinion, by the Solicitors' Journal, by the Irish Law Times and Solicitors' Journal and by the Clinical Journal. The accuracy of Who's Who 1936 was praised by Engineering. The Irish Law Times and Solicitors' Journal also praised the accuracy of that edition, but wrote that the book included an entry for a deceased person. The accuracy of Who's Who 1937 was praised by the Municipal Journal & Public Works Engineer. The accuracy of Who's Who 1938 was praised by the Journal of the Royal Institute of Public Health and Hygiene and by the New Statesman and Nation. The accuracy of Who's Who 1939 was praised by the Journal of the Royal Institute of Public Health and Hygiene.

The accuracy of Who's Who 1940 was praised by the Journal of the Royal Institute of Public Health and Hygiene, and the reliability of that edition was praised by The Tennessee Teacher. The accuracy of Who's Who 1941 was praised by the Journal of the Royal Institute of Public Health and Hygiene, by the Irish Law Times and Solicitors' Journal and by the Municipal Journal & Local Government Administrator. The accuracy of Who's Who, 1942 was praised by the Journal of the Royal Institute of Public Health and Hygiene and by The Accountant. The accuracy of Who's Who, 1943 was praised by the Medical Press and Circular. The accuracy of certain entries in Who's Who, 1944 was praised by the Journal of the Royal Institute of Public Health and Hygiene. The accuracy of Who's Who, 1946 was praised by the Irish Law Times and Solicitors' Journal. The accuracy of Who's Who, 1949 was praised by Subscription Books Bulletin.

In 1957, the reliability of Who's Who was praised by Ajit Kumar Mukherjee.

The accuracy and reliability of Who's Who 1970 was praised by Bodhan S Wynar. The accuracy of Who's Who 1973 was praised by Reference and Subscription Books Reviews. In 1974, the reliability of Who's Who was praised by John Richard Meredith Wilson. In 1975, the accuracy of Who's Who was praised by Carolyn Sue Peterson.

The accuracy of Who's Who 1982 was praised by Jefferson D  Caskey. The accuracy of Who's Who 1985 was praised by Jefferson D  Caskey. In 1986, the reliability of Who's Who was praised by John Richard Meredith Wilson. The accuracy of the entry for Reginald William Revans in Who's Who 1987 was praised by Yury Boshyk and Robert L Dilworth.

In 1995, the reliability of Who's Who was praised by Glenda Norquay.

Three articles by Watson-Smyth, by Crick and Rosenbaum, and by the BBC, published between 1998 and 2004, named ten people whose entries were claimed to have displayed at least one error at some point in time (excluding entries only claimed to contain omissions).

In 2001, BBC News qualified some of the entrants as "a little economical with the truth". Writing in The Spectator about a radio documentary on the book they did for BBC Radio 4 in 2004, Michael Crick and Martin Rosenbaum wrote that there were questions about the accuracy of the entries. They listed, amongst others, one entry that formerly claimed an incorrect alma mater. However, they wrote that they extensively used Who's Who themselves, and that any questions about the accuracy of the entries were not sufficient to actually stop them extensively using Who's Who themselves. In 2007, the reliability of Who's Who Online was praised by William A Kelly. In 2014, the reliability of the Who's Who & Who Was Who website was praised by Fred Burchsted.

Subjects are not permitted to include libellous statements in their entries. The publishing director for reference books of Bloomsbury, which owns the publisher of Who's Who, stated that if an inaccuracy was pointed to the editors, they would raise it with the biographee first. If the biographee insisted or failed to respond, however, no correction would be issued. The director stated that only a tiny minority of inaccuracies were not corrected.

Dates of birth
In 2004, Crick and Rosenbaum wrote that the largest number of errors were in dates of birth. It has been reported that entries for 
Mohamed al-Fayed, Anita Brookner, Ken Dodd, Susan Hampshire, Nanette Newman, and Nicholas Parsons have displayed incorrect dates of birth. The BBC wrote that when Brookner was asked by the editors of Who's Who if she wanted the date corrected, she asked to have it blanked instead. It has been reported that the entry for Jimmy Wray has displayed a disputed date of birth.

Particular entries
In 2001, BBC News claimed that former MP Jeffrey Archer had listed Brasenose College, Oxford under the education part of his Who's Who entry, despite having no degree and having only attended a one-year postgraduate physical education course. Previously, in a 1997 letter to the editor of The Independent, Paul Flather of Oxford University had written that the training course Archer had taken at Brasenose College was "not strictly a university course", and that his Who's Who entry also incorrectly listed his year of attendance. In 2004, Crick and Rosenbaum wrote that the entry for Archer had listed an incorrect sum of money.

The entry for James Gulliver in (in particular) Who's Who 1972, Who's Who 1973, Who's Who 1980, Who's Who 1985 and Who's Who 1986, stated that he had been educated at Harvard University and did not mention that he had been educated at, and had received an MSc from, the Georgia Institute of Technology in 1954. The press repeatedly reported that Gulliver had received an MBA from Harvard Business School. Those press reports were not correct. He had in fact done a marketing course at Harvard Business School for three weeks in 1954. On 9 March 1986, Gulliver said that his Who's Who entry was not correct in relation "to a degree achieved in 1954". The press had been informed of the error by a PR company working for an alcohol company that Gulliver's company had bid to takeover. Paddy Ashdown said that the PR company had performed "a rather unsavoury and tawdry" character "assassination". The bald statement that Gulliver was educated at the Harvard University has been characterized as having a tendency to mislead.

Omissions
In 2004, Crick and Rosenbaum named six people whose entries were claimed to have contained at least one omission at some point in time (excluding entries claimed to have displayed at least one error at some point in time).

Jeremy Paxman has also calculated that only 8% of new entrants in 2008 made any reference to marital breakdown, which is far below the national average.

Lists and tables
The original nucleus of Who's Who consisted of tables. In a review of Who's Who 1903, the Surveyor and Municipal and County Engineer wrote "From time to time it has been found necessary to remove some useful tables inserted in the front of the book, in order to make room for the biographies, and now the portentous increase of the latter has led to the complete removal of the tables, with the exception, of course, of those devoted to the Royal Family and to obituaries. The publishers hope . . . to issue the various tables separately . . . at a later date." The tables were moved into the Who's Who Year Book from the first edition of that year book, the Who's Who Year Book, 1904, onwards.

Who Was Who
When the subject of a Who's Who entry dies, the biography is transferred to the next volume of Who Was Who, where it is usually printed as it appeared in its last Who's Who, with the date of death added.

The first volume of Who Was Who covered deaths between 1897 and 1915. They were then published at 10-year intervals, and since 1990 at five-year intervals.

Who Was Who series:

 1897–1915, 1988 reprint: 
 1916–1928, 1992 reprint: 
 1929–1940, 1967 reprint: 
 1941–1950, 1980 reprint: 
 1951–1960, 1984 reprint: 
 1961–1970, 1979 reprint: 
 1971–1980, 1989 reprint: 
 1981–1990: 1991 
 1991–1995: 1996 
 1996–2000: 2001 
 2001–2005: 2006 
 2006–2010: 2011 
 2011–2015: 2016 

Corrections

Errors contained in Who's Who entries are corrected in Who Was Who. (The deceased subjects cannot object to corrections because they are deceased.)

References

Further reading
Ballou. Reference Books. PACAF Library Service Center. (Fifth Air Force, Pacific Air Forces). 1 September 1968. pp 178 & 179.
Fritze, Coutts and Vyhnanek. Reference Sources in History: An Introductory Guide. ABC-CLIO. Second Edition. 2004. pp 199 & 201.
James L Harner. Literary Research Guide. Fifth Edition. MLA. 2008. p 188.
Birch and Hooper. The Concise Oxford Companion to English Literature. Fourth Edition. 2012. p 772.
"What's What of Who's Who". Western Mail. 15 December 2001. TheFreeLibrary.
Gary Archer, "Review of Who's Who Online 2013 edition" (2013) 29 Refer 3 (No 1, Spring 2013) ProQuest
Malcolm Gladwell. "Nice to meet you. But what on earth are you doing here?" in "Books" in "The week in Reviews". The Observer. 11 January 1998. ProQuest
(1983) 250 The Spectator, 2 April 1983, p 16
Alan Watkins, "Who he?" (1979) 242 The Spectator, 12 May 1979, p 22 ProQuest [Review of Who's Who 1979]
"The Longest Novel" (1970) 258 Punch 731 (13 May 1970) [Review of Who's Who 1970]
"Curious Facts about Famous People" (1963) 44 Time and Tide 26 (21 to 27 March 1963) [Review of Who's Who 1963]
 
 
 
 
 
 
 
(1903) 19 Law Quarterly Review 109 Internet Archive Google Books
(1903) 37 Law Journal 611 Google Books
"Current Literature", The Spectator, 4 February 1865, p 20

External links 

 

Publications established in 1849
British biographical dictionaries
Online person databases
Series of non-fiction books
A & C Black books
1849 establishments in the United Kingdom